The Arecomici or Volcae Arecomici were a Gallic tribe dwelling between the Rhône and the Hérault rivers, around present-day Nîmes, during the Iron Age and the Roman period.

Name 
The meaning of the ethnonym Arecomici remains unclear. The Gaulish prefix are- means 'in front of, in the vicinity of', but the translation of the second element, -comici, is unknown. The name Volcae stems from Gaulish uolcos ('hawk').

Geography 
Their chief town Nemausus was inhabited since the Bronze Age; its original pre-Celtic name was likely forgotten after the takeover of the settlement by the Celtic Volcae.

Another settlement was known as Vindomagus ('white market').

History 
The Arecomici were probably first recognized or defined as a political entity by Rome around 75 BC. According to anthropologist Michael Dietler, the Roman colonization of the region, which led to the organization of Nemausus as a colonia Latina in the late 1st century AD, "resulted in the ethnogenesis of the Volcae Arecomici out of a formerly fluid coalition of different polities and ethnic groups".

They were indeed part of a political confederation encompassing multiple smaller tribes. By the early first century AD, the Volcae Arecomici were the dominant force of the confederation, ruling over twenty-four subject towns (oppida ignobilia) from their capital Nemausus.

Economy 
The Roman conquest was soon followed up by the first emissions of coins in Nemausus. Coins with the legend 'Volcae Arecomici' (AR/VOLC or VOLC/AREC) are dated to 70 BC.

References

Bibliography

Further reading
 Dupraz, Emmanuel. "Commémorations cultuelles gallo-grecques chez les Volques Arécomiques". In: Etudes Celtiques, vol. 44, 2018. pp. 35-72. DOI: https://doi.org/10.3406/ecelt.2018.2180; www.persee.fr/doc/ecelt_0373-1928_2018_num_44_1_2180

Historical Celtic peoples
Gauls
Tribes of pre-Roman Gaul